Dysoptus is a genus of moths in the family Arrhenophanidae.

Species
 Dysoptus acuminatus Davis, 2003
 Dysoptus anachoreta (Bradley, 1951)
 Dysoptus argus Davis, 2003
 Dysoptus asymmetrus Davis, 2003
 Dysoptus avittus Davis, 2003
 Dysoptus bilobus Davis, 2003
 Dysoptus chiquitus (Buschk, 1914)
 Dysoptus denticulatus Davis, 2003
 Dysoptus fasciatus Davis, 2003
 Dysoptus pentalobus Davis, 2003
 Dysoptus probata Walsingham, 1914
 Dysoptus prolatus Davis, 2003
 Dysoptus pseudargus Davis, 2003
 Dysoptus sparsimaculatus Davis, 2003
 Dysoptus spilacris Davis, 2003
 Dysoptus tantalota Meyrick, 1919

External links
Family Arrhenophanidae